Visitors to Tunisia must obtain a visa from one of the Tunisian diplomatic missions unless they come from one of the visa exempt countries.

Visa policy map

Visa exemption 

Citizens of the following 94 countries and territories can visit Tunisia for up to 90 days without a visa unless otherwise noted.

Nationals of Austria, Belgium, France, Germany, Italy, Luxembourg, Netherlands, Norway, Portugal, Spain, Sweden, Switzerland and United Kingdom (Gibraltar) can enter using a national ID card if travelling on an organized tour and holding a hotel voucher. 
Citizens of Canada and Germany can visit visa-free for up to 4 months. Citizens of Bulgaria can stay up to 2 months without a visa. Citizens of Greece are exempt up to 1 month. According to some sources the citizens of the United States can stay for up to 4 months without a visa. while other sources state that the maximum stay without a visa is 3 months.

Holders of diplomatic or service category passports issued to nationals of China, Egypt, India, Indonesia, Philippines and Ukraine; of official passports issued to nationals of Thailand; of diplomatic passports issued to nationals of Albania, Cuba, Czech Republic, Iran, Pakistan, Singapore, Syria, Uruguay and Vietnam do not require a visa.

Passengers with a residence permit issued by GCC Member States can obtain a visa on arrival for a maximum stay of 15 days. The residence permit must be valid for a minimum of 6 months from the arrival date and passengers must have a prepaid hotel reservation confirmation and sufficient funds to cover their stay.

Organized tours 

Citizens of the following countries may enter Tunisia without a visa if travelling on an organised tour and holding a hotel voucher.

eVisa
In July 2017 Tunisia announced plans to introduce electronic visas.
Until the online visa application is available, it is necessary to apply for a visa for Tunisia from the nearest Tunisian Embassy or Consulate.

See also

 Visa requirements for Tunisian citizens

References 

Tunisia
Foreign relations of Tunisia